Ralph Connor (1907-1990) was an American chemist.  
Connor is best known for his research in organic chemistry, catalysis, synthesis, explosives, and reaction mechanisms.  He served as a division chief on the National Defense Research Committee in World War II, and received many honors including the Priestley Medal of the American Chemical Society in 1967, Great Britain's King's Medal for Service in the Cause of Freedom, and the Gold Medal of the American Institute of Chemists, among others.

References

1907 births
1990 deaths
20th-century American chemists
Recipients of the King's Medal for Service in the Cause of Freedom